Inshaatchilar is a Baku Metro station. It was opened on 31 December 1985.

See also
List of Baku metro stations

References

Baku Metro stations
Railway stations opened in 1985
1985 establishments in Azerbaijan